Saltillo Fútbol Club, commonly known as Saltillo F.C., is a Mexican football club based in Saltillo, Coahuila. The club was founded in 2019, and currently plays in the Serie A of Liga Premier.

History

Origins
The club was founded in June 2017 as Atlético Saltillo Soccer through an alliance between the clubs Atlético Allende and Saltillo Soccer, the second team maintained a franchise called Titanes de Saltillo, which had been relegated from the Liga Premier de Ascenso, so it finally merged with the Atlético project. At first, it was sought that Atletico Saltillo played in Serie A, however, was finally placed in Serie B to not have the necessary requirements for the category of higher level.

On 11 August 2017, the first match of the club was played, tying with Club Calor by 0–0. At the end of the regular season of the Torneo Apertura 2017, the team qualified for the playoffs, being eliminated by Coyotes de Tlaxcala in the quarterfinal round. In the 2018-19 season, the team qualified again for the promotion playoffs.

For the 2019–2020 season, the Liga Premier de México allowed the promotion of several Serie B teams to Serie A to cover some spaces left after the departure of five Liga MX clubs reserve teams. On 28 June 2019, the entry of Atlético Saltillo Soccer in the category was confirmed. After confirming the participation of the team in Serie A, they began talks to create a single club that represents the city of Saltillo.

Saltillo F.C. 
On 24 July 2019, Atlético Saltillo Soccer and the Saltillo Soccer F.C. merged to create a new team called Saltillo F.C. However, officially the team was called Atlético Saltillo Soccer during the 2019–2020 season. In 2020, the team was recognised by FMF as Saltillo F.C.

Players

Current squad 
.

Reserve teams
Saltillo F.C. (Liga TDP)
Reserve team that plays in the Liga TDP, the fourth level of the Mexican league system.

Personnel

Coaching staff

Managers 
  Francisco Javier Gamboa (2019-2020)
  Ricardo López Estrada (2020)
  Jair García (2020–)

References

Association football clubs established in 2017
Football clubs in Coahuila
2017 establishments in Mexico
Saltillo
Liga Premier de México